Chih-Yi Chen is a soloist, accompanist and chamber musician. Her solo appearances take place throughout the United States, Europe, and Asia. Her collaborative experiences include performances with violinists Mark Kaplan, Ilya Kaler, Jaako Kuusisto, Robin Sharp, Barnabas Keleman, Richard Lin, violists Atar Arad, Yuval Gotlibovich, and cellist Csaba Onczay. She has also appeared under conductor Irwin Hoffman.

Her principal teachers include Lev Vlassenko and Luba Edlina-Dubinsky.

Chih-Yi Chen also teaches at the Indiana University Jacobs School of Music.

References

Taiwanese pianists
Living people
Accompanists
Indiana University faculty
21st-century American pianists
21st-century American women pianists
Year of birth missing (living people)
American women academics